K-144 is a  east–west state highway in the U.S. state of Kansas. K-144's western terminus is at a diamond interchange with U.S. Route 83 (US-83) and US-160 north-northwest of the City of Sublette and the eastern terminus is at US-56 northeast of the City of Copeland. K-144 travels through flat rural farmlands and is a two-lane road its entire length.

In a May 9, 1956 meeting, it was approved to add K-144 to the state highway system as soon as Haskell and Gray counties had brought the road up to state highway standards. By late 1957, required projects were complete and on September 25, 1957, K-144 was designated as a state highway. Between 2016 and 2017, the junction with US-83 and US-160 was converted to a diamond interchange as part of a project to expand US-83.

Route description
K-144's western terminus is at a diamond interchange with US-83 and US-160 north-northwest of Sublette. From here the highway begins traveling east and after about  intersects County Road Oo. The roadway proceeds through flat rural farmland for another  then intersects County Road Rr. K-144 continues east for about  it reaches an intersection with County Road Uu, which travels south to US-56. From here it continues another approximately  before reaching an intersection with County Road Ww. K-144 proceeds eastward for another approximately  then crosses into Gray County. About  into Gray County it intersects RS-285, also known as Plains Road or Dice Street. From here it continues for another  through flat rural farmlands before reaching an at-grade crossing with a Cimarron Valley Railroad track then reaches its eastern terminus at US-56.

The Kansas Department of Transportation (KDOT) tracks the traffic levels on its highways, and in 2019, they determined that on average the traffic varied from 870 vehicles per day near the western terminus to 975 vehicles per day near the eastern terminus. K-144 is not included in the National Highway System. The National Highway System is a system of highways important to the nation's defense, economy, and mobility. K-144 does connect to the National Highway System at its western terminus at US-83 and US-160.

History
The route was first authorized by the State Highway Commission of Kansas, now known as KDOT, in a May 9, 1956 meeting, as soon as Haskell and Gray counties had brought the road up to state highway standards. Then by  mid 1957, the counties had finished projects to bring the road up to state highway standards and on September 25, 1957, it was designated as K-144. When first planned, the eastern terminus was K-45, but was redesignated as US-56 by the time K-144 was established.

In late 2006, local consultation meetings began about rebuilding US-83 from Sublette north to Scott City. In 2009, KDOT began a future transportation needs study on the corridor. In a July 2010 study, plans were included for a diamond interchange to be built at the K-144 intersection. In February 2016, KDOT accepted a bid of $22.3 million (equivalent to $ in ) to convert the western terminus to a diamond interchange as well as reconstruct a  section of US-83. On June 26, 2017, K-144 was closed and on June 27, 2017, US-160 was closed from K-190 east to K-144 to allow work to begin to realign US-160 and K-144 with the new overpass. On July 25, 2017, US-83 was shifted onto the new alignment. On September 20, 2017, US-160 and K-144 reopened, with only minor work remaining to complete the entire project.

Major intersections

References

External links

Kansas Department of Transportation State Map
KDOT: Historic State Maps

144
Transportation in Haskell County, Kansas
Transportation in Gray County, Kansas